The Milwaukee Brewers of 1894–1901 were an American professional baseball team. They competed as members of the Western League from 1894 to 1899, then as members of the American League in 1900 and 1901. Both leagues were considered minor leagues during those seasons, except for  when the American League declared itself a major league.

History

The Western League had previously operated for multiple seasons between 1885 and 1892. It reorganized in November 1893, then operated continuously from 1894 through 1899, during which the Brewers competed. The league renamed itself as the American League for the 1900 season, during which the Brewers again competed.

Prior to the  season, the American League declared itself a major league, competing for players and revenue against the only other major league in operation at the time, the National League. Owned by Henry Killilea, the Brewers were managed by Hugh Duffy that season and finished last in the eight-team league. The team played at Lloyd Street Grounds, between 16th and 18th Streets in Milwaukee.

Prior to the  season, the Brewers were relocated to St. Louis and renamed as the St. Louis Browns. That franchise played in St. Louis through the 1953 season, then relocated again to become the Baltimore Orioles.

After the major-league team left Milwaukee following the 1901 season, a minor-league Milwaukee Brewers franchise competed in the American Association from 1902 through 1952.

See also
 History of the Baltimore Orioles
 History of professional baseball in Milwaukee

References

Baseball in Milwaukee
Professional baseball teams in Wisconsin
Defunct baseball teams in Wisconsin
Baseball teams established in 1894
Baseball teams disestablished in 1901
1894 establishments in Wisconsin
1901 disestablishments in Wisconsin
Defunct Western League teams
Defunct Major League Baseball teams